Semporna may refer to:
Semporna
Semporna (federal constituency), represented in the Dewan Rakyat